Artikulation is an electronic composition by György Ligeti. Composed and notated in January and February 1958, the piece was prepared and recorded on magnetic tape from February to March with the assistance of Gottfried Michael Koenig and Karlheinz Stockhausen's assistant, Cornelius Cardew, at the Studio for Electronic Music of the West German Radio (WDR) in Cologne. The piece consists of various types of sounds, "in conditions of aggregation." It "can be heard as a conversation without words". Ligeti explains in notes to the listening score (see below):

The (3:53-55 long) piece, in quadraphonic sound, was premiered March 25, 1958 at WDR Cologne's 'Musik der Zeit' concert series and September 4, 1958 at Darmstadt. It was heard again March 1993 at the New England Conservatory, while for recordings it has been mixed down to stereophonic sound.

Background
Ligeti had just fled from Budapest to Cologne in 1956, and Artikulation is the only one of three electronic pieces written in Cologne which remain in Ligeti's catalogue.
He completed only two works in the electronic medium, however—Glissandi (1957) and Artikulation (1958)—before returning to instrumental music. A third work, originally entitled Atmosphères but later known as Pièce électronique Nr. 3, was planned, and though the technical limitations of the time prevented Ligeti from realizing it completely, it was finally realized in 1996 by the Dutch composers Kees Tazelaar and Johan van Kreij of the Institute of Sonology.
See: List of compositions by György Ligeti. In composing Artikulation Ligeti, like many composers around him, was inspired by, "the age-old question of the relationship between music and speech", their approach greatly inspired by phoneticist Werner Meyer-Eppler. AllMusic'''s Blair Sanderson describes Artikulation as, "difficult to judge from its brevity and similarity to other tape experiments of the time".

Composition
Ligeti used both chance, such as in selection of sound segments, and an overall plan; all related to phonetics. "Part serial, part empirical, part aleatoric." Ligeti used technology including sine wave, white noise, and impulse generators, as well as filters.

Having conceived of many various possible and artificial phonemes, created recordings of them, and grouped them into various categories and bins, Ligeti created a formula (and many tables) to determine the maximum length of each tape used (the louder the shorter), and then went through a process of grabbing randomly, without-looking, similar "phonemes" out of their bins, combining them into "texts", and then cutting these in half, down to "words".

Despite this process, the piece has been described as, "spontaneous, even witty", "humorous", and as "influential". Holmes argues that though Ligeti abandoned electronic music after Glissandi and Artikulation, "it seems clear he could not have conceived some of his later works [such as Atmosphères] had he not learned the techniques of composing with slowly modulating textures and timbres that came with producing tape music."

Listening score
Fred Lerdahl argues that discretization is necessary not only for musical analysis but also for perception even by learned listeners, and thus that pieces such as Artikulation are inaccessible. In contrast, in 1970 graphic designer Rainer Wehinger (State University of Music and Performing Arts Stuttgart) created a "Hörpartitur" or "score for listening" for the piece, representing different sonorous effects with specific graphic symbols much like a transcription. Despite Ligeti's original notation, consisting of a large number of charts and tables, this score, approved by the composer, has been described as having, "a unique and appealing aesthetic", and as being, "easy to follow when viewed aligned with the music". As shown in the key to the score:

The depiction of frequency using the y-axis may be, "very approximate". The score was later synced to the music and posted on YouTube. Though Holmes finds, "the artistic value in visualizing this work...plain to see", Taruskin argues the score is "decorative or celebratory...rather than...practical".

Tom Service of The Guardian argues that even prior to Wehinger's score and its animation, "Ligeti himself imagined the sounds of Artikulation'' conjuring up images and ideas of labyrinths, texts, dialogues, insects, catastrophes, transformations, disappearances."

Legacy

In 2003, Matmos included the composition in a list of the best musique concrète work; they compared its length to that of pop singles and felt that the piece "makes the most out of the dramatic jumpcuts and juxtapositions which tape editing makes possible", comparing "the sudden upswoops, dropouts and hard-panned bursts of sound" to the work of Lee Perry and Wassily Kandinsky. They added: "Ligeti's compositional nous means that even when he's chopping up purely electronic source material (sine waves and snerts and blips and blops), he comes up with something strong and at times almost melodic, like an extended run of backwards reverbed birdsong."

See also
Additive synthesis
ADSR envelope
Reverberation
Spectral music

References

1958 compositions
Compositions by György Ligeti
Electronic compositions
Phonetics
Quadraphonic sound
Musique concrète